Frauenbad Stadthausquai is a public bath in Zürich, Switzerland, forming part of the historical Seeuferanlage promenades that were built between 1881 and 1887. Situated at the Stadthausquai by the Bürkliplatz plaza, the bath was built for, and is still exclusively used by women (Frauenbad means "bath for women").

Geography 
The small river bath is situated at Bürkliplatz below the Quaibrücke, just south of the artificial Bauschänzli island, in the Limmat. Road transport on Stadthausquai towards Münsterhof is limited; the next tram stop is at Bürkliplatz or Münsterbrücke, opposite of the upper Limmatquai towards Bellevueplatz.

History and description 
Zürich's government decided in 1837 to build a public bath for women, so that "they are no longer forced to bath at night in the fountains" and to protect them from the eyes of men. The former structure at the Bauschänzli was replaced in 1888 by the nostalgic Laubsägeli (literally: fretsaw) bath, named for its oriental curved corner turrets. The interior was covered in the early years with a braided roof as a sun shade. Moored on the river Limmat, the small wooden bath is well arranged and is open only to women, except for special events. In the  pool is a non-swimming section. Free swimming in the Limmat is prohibited.

Cultural Heritage 
The structure is listed in the Swiss inventory of cultural property of national and regional significance as a Class A object of national importance.

See also 
 Bauschänzli
 Bürkliplatz
 Quaianlagen

References

External links 

  

1888 establishments in Switzerland
Women-only spaces
Altstadt (Zürich)
Public baths in Switzerland
Buildings and structures in Zürich
History of Zürich
Swiss women
Culture of Zürich
Buildings and structures completed in 1888
Cultural property of national significance in the canton of Zürich
History of women in Switzerland
19th-century architecture in Switzerland